
140 BC was a year of the pre-Julian Roman calendar. At the time it was known as the Year of the Consulship of Sapiens and Caepio (or, less frequently, year 614 Ab urbe condita) and the First Year of Jianyuan. The denomination 140 BC for this year has been used since the early medieval period, when the Anno Domini calendar era became the prevalent method in Europe for naming years.

Events 
 By place 
 Africa 
Scipio Aemilianus leads a group of Roman ambassadors to Alexandria, where they meet with King Ptolemy VIII.

 Judea 
 Simon Maccabaeus crowned king of Judea.

Births 
 Huo Qubing, Chinese general of the Han dynasty (d. 117 BC)
 Lucius Licinius Crassus, Roman consul and statesman (d. 91 BC)
 Su Wu, Chinese diplomat and statesman (d. 60 BC)
 Tigranes the Great, king of Armenia (d. 55 BC)

Deaths

References